Kärlekens XYZ ("The XYZ of Love") is a 1971 Swedish sex educational film directed by Torgny Wickman. It is a sequel to the two films Language of Love (1969) and Mera ur kärlekens språk (1970). In 1973 the three films were edited together into a new film, Det bästa ur Kärlekens språk-filmerna ("The Best from the Language of Love Films").

Cast
 Maj-Briht Bergström-Walan
 Leif Silbersky
 Inge Hegeler
 Sten Hegeler
 Joachim Israel
 Ola Ullsten
 Birgitta Linnér
 Rune Pär Olofsson
 Lars Engström
 Göran Bergstrand
 Tommy Hedlund
 Arne Mellgren
 Göran Hallberg
 Rune Hallberg
 Kim Anderzon
 Seth Nilsson
 Bent Rohweder
 Sven Olof Erikson
 Axel Segerström

References

External links
 
 
 

Swedish erotic films
1970s erotic films
1970s Swedish films